India-Holy See relations are the bilateral relations between the India and Holy See, which is sovereign over the Vatican City. Formal bilateral relations between the two exist since 12 June 1948. An Apostolic Delegation existed from 1881. The Holy See has a nunciature in New Delhi while India has accredited its embassy in Bern, Switzerland to the Holy See as well. India's Ambassador in Bern has traditionally been accredited to the Holy See. In a break from tradition, it was announced in October 2020 that Jaideep Mazumdar, India's ambassador to Austria would be the next ambassador to the Holy See. Archbishop Leopoldo Girelli was appointed as the Apostolic Nuncio to India in March 2021.

History
Connections between the Catholic church and India can be traced back to the apostle St. Thomas, who, according to tradition, came to India in 52 AD. Bishops were sent to India from Syria as early as the 6th or 7th centuries. There is a record of an Indian bishop visiting Rome at the time of Pope Callixtus II (1119–1124).

The diplomatic mission was established as the Apostolic Delegation to the East Indies in 1881, and included Ceylon, and was extended to Malaca in 1889, and then to Burma in 1920, and eventually included Goa in 1923. It was raised to an Internunciature by Pope Pius XII on 12 June 1948 and to a full Apostolic Nunciature by Pope Paul VI on 22 August 1967. India initially had a legation to the Holy See, with the Minister at Berne accredited as Minister to the Holy See. The Indian mission was raised to the status of an embassy led by an ambassador in 1965.

Bilateral visits
There have been three Papal visits to India. The first Pope to visit India was Pope Paul VI, who visited Mumbai in 1964 to attend the International Eucharistic Congress. Pope John Paul II visited several places in India including Chennai in February 1986 and then again visited New Delhi in November 1999. Several Indian dignitaries have, from time to time, called on the Pope in the Vatican.  These include Prime Minister Jawaharlal Nehru in 1955, Prime Minister Indira Gandhi in 1981, Prime Minister I.K. Gujral in September 1997, Prime Minister Atal Bihari Vajpayee in 2000 and Prime Minister Narendra Modi in 2021. Vice-president Bhairon Singh Shekhawat represented the country at the funeral of Pope John Paul II. External Affairs minister Sushma Swaraj led a delegation to the Vatican for the canonisation function of Saint Teresa of Calcutta in September 2016, when she also called on Pope Francis. She was accompanied by the Chief Minister of West Bengal, Mamata Banerjee.

Indian ambassadors to the Holy See

Reference:

See also
 Apostolic Nunciature to India

References

Further reading
 India- Holy See relations – Ministry of External Affairs

External links
 Apostolic Nunciature to India

 
Holy See
India